Duke of Nericia or Duke of Närke  is a Swedish substantive title.

This is a list of Swedish princes who have held Närke as duke:
 Prince Carl, Duke of Nericia 1560–1604 (also of Södermanland and Värmland), then King Carl IX of Sweden
 Prince Carl Philip, Duke of Nericia 1607–1618 (also of Södermanland and Värmland), brother of King Gustav II Adolf
 Prince Eugen (1865–1947), Duke of Nericia, brother of King Gustaf V of Sweden.

Swedish monarchy
Sweden history-related lists
Dukedoms of Sweden
Nericia